is a Japanese actress. While working as a child actress she was represented by Moon the Child Agency. Her representative works includes the television series Oh! My Girl!!, Hanayome to Papa and Yamada Taro Monogatari. She is represented by Ken-On. Her former stage name was Riko Yoshida (吉田 里琴).

Filmography

Film

Television dramas

Japanese dub

Awards

References

External links
 
 

Living people
1999 births
Japanese child actresses
21st-century Japanese singers
21st-century Japanese women singers
21st-century Japanese actresses